Bağdat Avenue (literally Baghdad Avenue) is one of the most important high streets on the Anatolian side of Istanbul, Turkey. The most important part of the street runs  from Bostancı to Kızıltoprak within the district of Kadıköy. Bağdat Avenue is usually seen as the counterpart of Istiklal Avenue on the European side of the city in terms of its importance and glamour although it lacks the fine heritage of historic buildings to be found on Istiklal Avenue with almost all its architecture modern. 

Bağdat Caddesi mainly runs through middle and upper-class residential areas. A one-way street for traffic, it is lined with old plane trees and flanked by a series of shopping malls, boutiques and elegant shops offering world-famous brands, as well as by restaurants serving international and local cuisine, pubs and cafes, luxury car dealers and banks. Most of the shops are open seven days a week, including Sunday afternoons.

Heading westwards, Bağdat Avenue runs through: Cevizli, Maltepe, İdealtepe, Küçükyalı, Altıntepe,  Bostancı, Çatalçeşme, Suadiye, Şaşkınbakkal, Erenköy, Caddebostan, Göztepe, Çiftehavuzlar, Selamiçeşme, Feneryolu and Kızıltoprak. The busiest stretches of Bağdat Avenue run between Suadiye and Caddebostan, where most of the shopping malls and fashion stores are located.

Bağdat Avenue offers a variety of transport options including buses, dolmuşes, taxis and rentable scooters. Within walking distance of the avenue there are seabus (high-speed catamaran ferry) terminals in Kadıköy and Bostancı. The Marmaray railway running just north of the avenue serves Bostancı which has a quay for commuter ferries, which connect the Asian side of the city with the European side, as well as for ferries to the nearby Princes' Islands.

History

Bağdat Avenue started life as a road connecting Constantinople with Anatolia during the Byzantine and later the Ottoman periods, when it was used for trade and military purposes. It acquired its name after the recapture of Baghdad by Sultan Murad IV in 1638. However, the original road started from Üsküdar and passed through Haydarpaşa Meadows, joining what became the later route in Kızıltoprak. 

The Ottomans built fountains with namazgahs (open-air areas set aside for prayer) along the road to serve travellers arriving to or departing from the city. Some of the neighbourhoods along Bağdat Avenue are still named after these fountains, such as Söğütlüçeşme (Willow Fountain), Selamiçeşme, and Çatalçeşme (Forked Fountain).

During the reign of Sultan Abdul Hamid II (1876–1909), some pashas, high officials and wealthy traders purchased land around Bağdat Avenue and erected luxurious chalet-like wooden mansions, a few of which still exist today.

Before World War I, the avenue was paved with cobblestones, and carriages were used for transportation. In the early years of the Republican era, the original cobblestoned avenue was covered with asphalt, and a tram line was constructed between Kadıköy and Bostancı.

Until the 1960s, the coastal area close to Bağdat Avenue served as a summer resort primarily for the city's upper and middle classes, who mainly lived on the European side of İstanbul closer to their businesses. Following the opening of the Bosphorus Bridge in 1973, these low-rise summer houses were pulled down in favour of new high-rise condominiums and some suburbs along Bağdat Avenue developed into particularly desirable residential areas.

Attractions 
There are several large public parks just off Bağdat Caddesi. These include Özgürlük (Freedom) Park in Selamiçeşme and Göztepe Park which offers wonderful displays of tulips in April and of roses in June.

The small mosques along Bağdat Caddesi only date from the late 19th century. Most prominent are the Zühtü Paşa Mosque in Kızıltoprak (1885) ad the Galip Paşa Mosque in Caddebostan (1889).

In the back streets of Göztepe there is a fine Toy Museum, signposted by lampposts in the shape of giraffes. 

Overlooking the Sea of Marmara at Caddebostan stands the magnificent, if abandoned, Ragip Paşa Mansion, a work of August Jasmund in 1906. Right next door is the mansion built for his daughter Tevhide Hanım.

Celebrations

Bağdat Avenue hosts a cultural parade on the evening of Republic Day, which is celebrated every year on October 29.

Celebrations also take place on Bağdat Avenue whenever the home football team Fenerbahçe SK wins the championship title in the Turkish Super League. Fenerbahçe fans gather here and celebrate by singing, dancing, driving and sounding their car horns all night.

Since the 1960s street racing has formed a local sub-culture, with wealthy young men tag-racing their imported muscle cars. Most of these young men are now middle-agers reliving their years of excitement as famous professional rally or track racers. With the heightened GTI and hot hatch culture starting in the 1990s, street-racing was revived. Towards the end of the 1990s, midnight street racing caused many fatal accidents, which were only reduced by intensive police patrols.

Namesakes
In some other parts of Turkey and elsewhere around the world, there are streets of the same name:
 Heliopolis, Egypt
 Sivas, Turkey
 Kayseri, Turkey
 Singapore

See also
 Abdi İpekçi Avenue
 İstiklal Avenue
 List of upscale shopping districts

References

External links

  Kadıköy Journal Homepage 
 Bağdat Street Net 
 Bağdat Caddesi 3D Virtual Tour 

Streets in Istanbul
Shopping districts and streets in Turkey
Kadıköy
Restaurant districts and streets in Turkey
Entertainment districts in Turkey